Lysander Spooner (January 19, 1808May 14, 1887) was an American individualist anarchist, abolitionist, entrepreneur, essayist, legal theorist, pamphletist, political philosopher, Unitarian and writer.

Spooner was a strong advocate of the labor movement and anti-authoritarian and individualist anarchist in his political views. His economic and political ideology has been identified by some scholars libertarian socialism, left-libertarianism, free-market socialism, and mutualism, while others identify them as right-libertarian, anarcho-capitalist, and propertarianist. According to anarchist George Woodcock, Spooner was a member of the International Workingmen's Association (First International). His writings contributed to the development of both left-libertarian and right-libertarian political theory. Many have cited him as one of the major founding theorists of mutualism.Spooner's writings include the abolitionist book The Unconstitutionality of Slavery and No Treason: The Constitution of No Authority, which opposed treason charges against secessionists. Spooner is also known for competing with the Post Office with his American Letter Mail Company. However, it was closed after legal problems with the federal government.

Biography

Early life

Spooner was born on a farm in Athol, Massachusetts on January 19, 1808. Spooner's parents were Asa and Dolly Spooner. One of his ancestors, William Spooner, arrived in Plymouth in 1637. Lysander was the second of nine children. His father was a deist and it has been speculated that he purposely named his two older sons Leander and Lysander after pagan and Spartan heroes, respectively.

Legal career
Spooner's activism began with his career as a lawyer, which itself violated Massachusetts law. Spooner had studied law under the prominent lawyers, politicians and abolitionists John Davis, later Governor of Massachusetts and Senator; and Charles Allen, state senator and Representative from the Free Soil Party. However, he never attended college. According to the laws of the state, college graduates were required to study with an attorney for three years while non-graduates like Lysander would be required to do so for five years.

With the encouragement from his legal mentors, Spooner set up his practice in Worcester, Massachusetts, after only three years, defying the courts. He regarded three-year privilege for college graduates as a state-sponsored discrimination against the poor and also providing a monopoly income to those who met the requirements. He argued that "no one has yet ever dared advocate, in direct terms, so monstrous a principle as that the rich ought to be protected by law from the competition of the poor". In 1836, the legislature abolished the restriction. He opposed all licensing requirements for lawyers, doctors, or anyone else that was prevented from being employed by such requirements. For Spooner, to prevent a person from doing business with a person without a professional license was a violation of the natural right to contract. Spooner advocated natural law, or what he called the science of justice, wherein acts of initiatory coercion against individuals and their property, including taxation, were considered criminal because they were immoral, while the so-called criminal acts that violated only man-made arbitrary legislation were not necessarily criminal.

After a disappointing legal career and a failed career in real estate speculation in Ohio, Spooner returned to his father's farm in 1840.

American Letter Mail Company
Being an advocate of self-employment and opponent of government regulation of business, in 1844 Spooner started the American Letter Mail Company, which competed with the United States Post Office, whose rates were very high. It had offices in various cities, including Baltimore, Philadelphia and New York City. Stamps could be purchased and then attached to letters, which could be brought to any of its offices. From here, agents were dispatched who traveled on railroads and steamboats and carried the letters in handbags. Letters were transferred to messengers in the cities along the routes, who then delivered the letters to the addressees. This was a challenge to the Post Office's legal monopoly.

As he had done when challenging the rules of the Massachusetts Bar Association, Spooner published a pamphlet titled "The Unconstitutionality of the Laws of Congress Prohibiting Private Mails". Although Spooner had finally found commercial success with his mail company, legal challenges by the government eventually exhausted his financial resources. A law enacted in 1851 that strengthened the federal government's monopoly finally put him out of business. The legacy of Spooner's challenge to the postal service was the reduction in letter postage from 5¢ to 3¢, in response to the competition his company provided which lasted until late 1950's or early 1960's.

Abolitionism
Spooner attained his highest profile as a figure in the abolitionist movement. His book The Unconstitutionality of Slavery, published in 1845, contributed to a controversy among abolitionists over whether the Constitution supported the institution of slavery. The disunionist faction led by William Lloyd Garrison and Wendell Phillips argued that the Constitution legally recognized and enforced the oppression of slaves as in the provisions for the capture of fugitive slaves in Article IV, Section 2. More generally, Phillips disputed Spooner's notion that any unjust law should be held legally void by judges.

Spooner challenged the claim that the text of the Constitution permitted slavery. Although he recognized that the Founding Fathers had probably not intended to outlaw slavery when writing the Constitution, Spooner argued that only the meaning of the text, not the private intentions of its writers, was enforceable. He used a complex system of legal and natural law arguments to show that the clauses usually interpreted as supporting slavery did not in fact support it and that several clauses of the Constitution prohibited the states from establishing slavery. Both the above discounted reality that slavery was in place before the Constitution was ever ratified and framers were forced to use compromise with existence of established investments whether those were illegal or not to gain its ratification. Spooner's arguments were cited by other pro-Constitution abolitionists such as Gerrit Smith and the Liberty Party, the twenty-second plank of whose 1849 platform praised Spooner's book The Unconstitutionality of Slavery. Frederick Douglass, originally a Garrisonian disunionist, later came to accept the pro-Constitution position and cited Spooner's arguments as an influence upon his change of mind.

From the publication of this book until 1861, Spooner actively campaigned against slavery. He published subsequent pamphlets on jury nullification and other legal defenses for escaped slaves, and offered his legal services to fugitives, often free of charge. In the late 1850s, copies of his book were distributed to members of Congress.  Even Senator Albert G. Brown of Mississippi, a slavery proponent, praised the argument's intellectual rigor and conceded it was the most formidable legal challenge he had seen from the abolitionists to date. In 1858, Spooner circulated a "Plan for the Abolition of Slavery", calling for the use of guerrilla warfare against slaveholders by black slaves and non-slaveholding free Southerners, with aid from Northern abolitionists. Spooner also "conspir[ed] with John Brown to promote a servile insurrection in the South" and participated in an aborted plot to free Brown after his capture following the failed raid on Harper's Ferry, Virginia (now part of the state of West Virginia).

Although he had advocated the use of violence to abolish slavery, Spooner denounced the Republicans' use of violence to prevent the Southern states from seceding during the American Civil War. He published several letters and pamphlets about the war, arguing that the  Lincoln’s objective was not to eradicate slavery, but rather to preserve the Union by force. He blamed the bloodshed on Republican political leaders such as Secretary of State William H. Seward and Senator Charles Sumner, who often criticized slavery yet would not attack it on a constitutional basis, and who pursued military policies Spooner described as vengeful and abusive. He viewed that the Northern states were trying to deny the Southerners through military force.

He argued that the northern concession on the constitutionality of slavery, that it was permitted. Gave southern states a constitutionally defendable justification for seceding, to continue slavery. 

For which he sharply criticized them: 
"Upon yourself, and others like you, professed friends of freedom, who, instead of promulgating what you believed to be the truth, have, for selfish purposes, denied it, and thus conceded to the slaveholders the benefit of an argument to which they had no claim, upon your heads, more even, if possible, than upon the slaveholders themselves, (who have acted only in accordance with their associations, interests, and avowed principles as slaveholders.) rests the blood of this horrible, unnecessary, and therefore guilty, war."This argument was unpopular both in the North and in the South after the Civil War began, as it conflicted with the official position of both governments.

Later life and death

Spooner continued to write and publish extensively during the decades following Reconstruction, producing works such as his essay "Natural Law or the Science of Justice" and the short book Trial by Jury. In Trial by Jury, he defended the doctrine of jury nullification which holds that in a free society a trial jury not only has the authority to rule on the facts of the case, but also on the legitimacy of the law under which the case is tried. This doctrine would further allow juries to refuse to convict if they regard the law by which they are asked to convict as illegitimate. Spooner became associated with Benjamin Tucker's American individualist anarchist journal Liberty which published all of his later works in serial format and for which he wrote several editorial columns on current events.

Spooner argued that "almost all fortunes are made out of the capital and labour of other men than those who realize them. Indeed, except by his sponging capital and labour from others". Spooner defended the Millerites, who stopped working because they believed the world would soon end and were arrested for vagrancy.

Spooner spent much time in the Boston Athenæum. He died on May 14, 1887, at the age of 79 in his nearby residence at 109 Myrtle Street, Boston. He never married and had no children. Tucker arranged his funeral service and wrote a "loving obituary" entitled "Our Nestor Taken From Us" which appeared in Liberty on May 28 and predicted "that the name Lysander Spooner would be 'henceforth memorable among men'".

Political views
Anarchist George Woodcock, among others, describes Spooner's essays as an "eloquent elaboration" of American anarchist Josiah Warren and the early American development of Pierre-Joseph Proudhon's mutualist ideas and associates his works with that of American individualist anarchist Stephen Pearl Andrews. Woodcock also reports that both Spooner and William Batchelder Greene had been members of the socialist First International. According to Peter Marshall, "the egalitarian implications of traditional individualist anarchists" such as Spooner and Benjamin Tucker have been overlooked. According to Stephanie Silberstein, "While Spooner was no free-market capitalist, nor an anarcho-capitalist, he was not as opposed to capitalism as most socialists were."

Spooner was an advocate for absolute property rights based on Lockean principles of initial acquisition. He wrote:

As an individualist anarchist, Spooner advocated for pre-industrial living in communities of small property holders so that they could pursue life, liberty, happiness and property in mutual honesty without ceding responsibility to a central government. Spooner felt that an expansive government created virtual slaves and its demands of obedience expropriated the role of the individual. By letting the government make and enforce laws, Spooner contended that Americans "have surrendered their liberties unreservedly into the hands of the government". In addition to his extra-governmental post service and views on abolitionism, Spooner wrote No Treason in which he contends that the Constitution is neither a contract nor a text to which citizens are bound. Spooner argued that the national Congress should dissolve and let citizens rule themselves as he held that individuals should make their own fates.

Spooner believed that it was beneficial for people to be self-employed so that they could enjoy the full benefits of their labor rather than having to share them with an employer. He argued that various forms of government intervention in the free market made it difficult for people to start their own businesses. For one, he believed that laws against high interest rates, or usury, prevented those with capital from extending credit because they could not be compensated for high risks of not being repaid, writing:
If a man have not capital of his own, upon which to bestow his labor, it is necessary that he be allowed to obtain it on credit. And in order that he may be able to obtain it on credit, it is necessary that he be allowed to contract for such a rate of interest as will induce a man, having surplus capital, to loan it to him; for the capitalist cannot, consistently with natural law, be compelled to loan his capital against his will. All legislative restraints upon the rate of interest, are, therefore, nothing less than arbitrary and tyrannical restraints upon a man's natural capacity amid natural right to hire capital, upon which to bestow his labor. [...] The effect of usury laws, then, is to give a monopoly of the right of borrowing money, to those few, who can offer the most approved security.

Spooner believed that government restrictions on issuance of private money made it inordinately difficult for individuals to obtain the capital on credit to start their own businesses, thereby putting them in a situation where "a very large portion of them, to save themselves from starvation, have no alternative but to sell their labor to others" and those who do employ others are only able to afford to pay "far below what the laborers could produce, [than] if they themselves had the necessary capital to work with". Spooner said that there was "a prohibitory tax – a tax of ten per cent – on all notes issued for circulation as money, other than the notes of the United States and the national banks" which he argued caused an artificial shortage of credit and that eliminating this tax would result in making plenty of money available for lending.

Spooner believed that altruism should not be enforced, but that one still has a moral obligation to help others, writing:

Spooner was opposed to wage labor, believing that no worker would work for a capitalist if they had alternatives, tools to bestow their own labour upon, arguing: 

All the great establishments, of every kind, now in the hands of a few proprietors, but employing a great number of wage labourers, would be broken up; for few or no persons, who could hire capital and do business for themselves would consent to labour for wages for another.

In response to anarcho-capitalists arguing that Spooner was a right-libertarian and anarcho-capitalist, Iain MacSaorsa argues that because Spooner was opposed to wage labor, he was a socialist of a particular kind, particularly market socialism, since capitalism is not the only market system. Spooner's membership to the socialist First International and opposition to wage labor is why the authors of An Anarchist FAQ and anarchist historians such as James Martin and Peter Marshall consider him an anti-capitalist left-libertarian, libertarian socialist, and market socialist.

In fiction
 Robert Heinlein's science fiction makes several references to Spooner, and some of his fictional worlds are based on Spooner's ideas.
 The science fiction novel ""Scam Artists of the Galaxy"" for its fourth planet visits Nirvana, which is explicitly based on Spooner principles, making it impossible for the scammers to succeed there.

Influence

Spooner's influence extends to the wide range of topics he addressed during his lifetime. He is remembered primarily for his abolitionist activities and for his challenge to the Post Office monopoly which had a lasting influence of significantly reducing postal rates, according to the Journal of Libertarian Studies.

Spooner's writings were a major influence on Austrian School economist Murray Rothbard and right-libertarian law professor and legal theorist Randy Barnett. His writings were often reprinted in early libertarian journals such as the Rampart Journal and Left and Right: A Journal of Libertarian Thought. While influencing anarcho-capitalists such as Rothbard, MacSaorsa argues that Spooner was an "anti-capitalist" who preferred to see "a society of self-employed farmers, artisans and cooperating workers, not a society of wage slaves and capitalists". MacSaorsa further argues that Spooner was opposed to wage labor, "wanting that social relationship destroyed by turning capital over to those who work in it, as associated producers and not as wage slaves".

In January 2004, Laissez Faire Books established the Lysander Spooner Award for advancing the literature of liberty. The honor is awarded monthly to the most important contributions to right-libertarian literature, followed by an annual award to the winner. In 2010, the Libertarian, Agorist, Voluntaryist and Anarch Association of Authors and Publishers (LAVA) created the Lysander Spooner Award for Book of the Year which has been awarded annually since 2011. The LAVA Awards are held annually to honor excellence in books relating to the principles of liberty, with the Lysander Spooner Award being the grand prize award.

Spooner's The Unconstitutionality of Slavery was cited in the 2008 Supreme Court case District of Columbia v. Heller which struck down the federal district's ban on handguns. Justice Antonin Scalia, writing for the court, quotes Spooner as saying the right to bear arms was necessary for those who wanted to take a stand against slavery. It was also cited by Justice Clarence Thomas in his concurring opinion in McDonald v. Chicago, another firearms case, the following year.

Publications
Virtually everything written by Spooner is contained in the six-volume compilation The Collected Works of Lysander Spooner (1971). The most notable exception is Vices Are Not Crimes, not widely known until its republication in 1977.
 "The Deist's Immortality, and An Essay on Man's Accountability for His Belief" (1834)
 "The Deist's Reply to the Alleged Supernatural Evidences of Christianity" (1836)
 "Constitutional Law, Relative to Credit, Currency, and Banking" (1843)
 "The Unconstitutionality of the Laws of Congress, Prohibiting Private Mails" (1844)
 The Unconstitutionality of Slavery (1845)
 "Poverty: Its Illegal Causes, and Legal Cure" (1846)
 "Illegality of the Trial of John W. Webster" (1850)
 "An Essay on Trial by Jury" (1852)
 "The Law of Intellectual Property" (1855)
 "A Plan for the Abolition of Slavery, and To the Non-Slaveholders of the South" (1858)
 "Address of the Free Constitutionalists to the People of the United States" (1860)
 "A New System of Paper Currency" (1861)
 "A Letter to Charles Sumner" (1864)
 "Considerations for Bankers, and Holders of United States Bonds" (1864)
 No Treason No. I (1870)
 No Treason No. II: The Constitution (1870)
 No Treason: The Constitution of No Authority (1870)
 "Forced Consent" (1873)
 "Vices Are Not Crimes: A Vindication of Moral Liberty" (1875)
 "Our Financiers: Their Ignorance, Usurpations and Frauds" (1877)
 "Gold and Silver as Standards of Value: The Flagrant Cheat in Regard to Them" (1878)
 "Natural Law, or the Science of Justice" (1882)
 "A Letter to Thomas F. Bayard" (1882)
 "A Letter to Scientists and Inventors, on the Science of Justice" (1884)
 "A Letter to Grover Cleveland, on His False Inaugural Address, the Usurpations and Crimes of Lawmakers and Judges, and the Consequent Poverty, Ignorance, and Servitude of the People" (1886)
 "Two Treatises on Competitive Currency and Banking"  (2018)

Archival material
There are collections of letters written by Spooner in the Boston Public Library and the New York Historical Society.

See also

 Abolitionism in the United States
 American philosophy
 Individualist anarchism
 Free-market anarchism
 Left-libertarianism
 Left-wing market anarchism
 List of American philosophers
 List of civil rights leaders
 Mutualism (economic theory)
 Natural and legal rights
 Natural law

References

Further reading

External links

 LysanderSpooner.org, dedicated website
 
 
 
 
 Reason Magazine

1808 births
1887 deaths
19th-century American businesspeople
19th-century American essayists
19th-century American journalists
19th-century American male writers
19th-century American non-fiction writers
Abolitionists from Boston
American anarchists
American anti-capitalists
American anti-war activists
American deists
American gun rights activists
American legal writers
American libertarians
American male essayists
American male journalists
American male non-fiction writers
American opinion journalists
American pamphleteers
American political journalists
American political philosophers
American political writers
American socialists
American syndicalists
Anarchist theorists
Anarchist writers
Burials at Forest Hills Cemetery (Boston)
Deist philosophers
Far-left politics in the United States
Individualist anarchists
John Brown's raid on Harpers Ferry
Jury nullification
Left-libertarians
Libertarian socialists
Libertarian theorists
Anarcho-capitalism
Massachusetts lawyers
Mutualists
Non-interventionism
People from Athol, Massachusetts
People of Massachusetts in the American Civil War
Philosophers from Massachusetts
Philosophy writers
Recipients of aid from Gerrit Smith
Social anarchists
Writers from Massachusetts